Sahibganj subdivision is an administrative subdivision of the Sahibganj district in the Santhal Pargana division in the state of Jharkhand, India.

History
As a result of the Santhal rebellion, Act XXXVII of 1855 was passed by the British Raj, and a separate district called Santhal Pargana was carved out of parts of Birbhum and Bhagalpur districts. Santhal Pargana had four sub-districts – Dumka, Godda, Deoghar and Rajmahal. Subsequently, Santal Pargana district comprised Dumka, Deoghar, Sahibganj, Godda, Pakur and Jamtara sub-divisions. In 1983 Deoghar, Sahibganj  and Godda subdivisions were given district status.

Administrative set up
Sahibganj district has two subdivisions: Sahibganj and Rajmahal. Sahibganj, Mandro, Borio and Barheit community development blocks and Sahebganj town are in Sahibganj subdivision.

Sahibganj district has two subdivisions:

Demographics
According to the 2011 Census of India data, Sahibganj subdivision, in Sahibganj district, had a total population of 465,851. There were 239,473 (51%) males and 226,378 (49%) females. Scheduled castes numbered 27,567 (5.92%) and scheduled tribes numbered 185,199 (39.75%). Literacy rate was 42.93%.

See also – List of Jharkhand districts ranked by literacy rate

Police stations
Police stations in Sahibganj subdivision are at:
 Town
 Muffasil
 Mirzachauki
 Barhait
 Borio

Blocks
Community development blocks in Sahibganj subdivision are:

Education
In 2011, in the CD blocks of Sahibganj subdivision out of a total 672 inhabited villages there were 116 villages with pre-primary schools, 431 villages with primary schools, 150 villages with middle schools, 15 villages with secondary schools, 5 villages with senior secondary schools, 1 village with vocational training school/ ITI, 233 villages with no educational facility.
.*Senior secondary schools are also known as Inter colleges in Jharkhand

Educational facilities
(Information about degree colleges with proper reference may be added here)

Healthcare
In 2011, in the CD blocks of Sahibganj subdivision there were 12 villages with primary health centres, 40 villages with primary health subcentres, 6 villages with maternity and child welfare centres, 7 villages with allopathic hospitals, 7 villages with dispensaries, 1 village with veterinary hospital, 8 villages with family welfare centres, 160 villages with medicine shops.
.*Private medical practitioners, alternative medicine etc. not included

Medical facilities
(Anybody having referenced information about location of government/ private medical facilities may please add it here)

References

Sub-divisions in Jharkhand